Al-Naft Sports Club is an Iraqi professional basketball club based in the Al-Rusafa district in Baghdad. Owned and operated by the Ministry of Oil, the team plays in the Iraqi Basketball League and has won six national league championships. The team is part of the Al-Naft SC sports club that also fields a football team. Home games of Al-Naft are played in the Al Shaeb Hall.

In 2022–23, Al-Naft played in the inaugural season of the West Asia Super League (WASL). In 2019 they had already played in the WABA Champions Cup and finished in the third place.

Honours 
Iraqi Basketball League

 Champions (6): 1994–95, 2016–17, 2017–18, 2018–19, 2020–21, 2021–22

WABA Champions Cup

 Third place (1): 2019

Players

Current roster
As of 31 January 2023.

Notable players 

  Édgar Sosa: (2022–23)
  Tony Mitchell: (2022–23)
  Antwaine Wiggins: (2022–23)

References 

Basketball teams in Iraq
Sport in Baghdad
Basketball teams established in 1977